= Kimasar river gorge =

River gorge in Kazakhstan

Coordinates: 43°9′47.3″N 77°4′34.6″E

The Kimasar river gorge is the second longest side gorge of the Malaya-Almatinka river basin in Kazakhstan. It has a length of 6 km. Thanks to the waters of the Malaya Almatinka river, the Eastern part of the city of Almaty is fed. The right gorge of the Kimasar river leads to the Komissarovsky pass. The North-Western borders of the slope are planted with chinturgen firs and pines.

== Description ==
At the mouth of the gorge are located water treatment facilities of the organization "Gorvodokanal". The waters of the Malaya Almatinka river after cleaning feed the Eastern part of Almaty. Above the station, after 1.3 km, the gorge forks. At the fork is the Jaeger cordon. From him down the gorge to the water treatment plant paved path. A heavily damaged paved road leads to the cordon. Then only dirt roads are laid. The right gorge leads to the Komissarovsky pass. The North-Western slopes of the cordon are densely planted with pine trees. Two concrete bridges span the lower part of the left gorge. A dirt road passes through the gorge, which leads to the inner valley. This is a convenient place for overnight stays and picnics. In the valley until July, there are often avalanche cones left over from avalanches that descended in winter, where you can safely ski and sledge.

== Name ==
There are two versions of the origin of the name: from the Kazakh word "Kim Asar," which translates as "Who will help" and from the word "Commissar".

== See also ==
- Список национальных парков Казахстана
